Human Like a House is an album by American folk-pop duo The Finches. It was released on January 30, 2007. The album's packaging contained woodcut drawings created by vocalist Carolyn Pennypacker Riggs.

Critical reception
Pitchfork wrote that the album's "backward thinking, front-porch-rocking-chair charisma pales in comparison to more progressive folk contemporaries." Exclaim! called Human Like a House "an album of simple compositions and gentle melodies." SF Weekly wrote that "the songs unwind slowly here, sedate melodies that soothe you into a false sense of security, but under the placid surface are hints at ancient wounds that refuse to heal."

Track listing

 "Human Like A House" - 4:07
 "June Carter Cash" - 2:31
 "Last Favor" - 2:38
 "Nightswimming, AR" - 3:56
 "Lay" - 3:33
 "The House Under The Hill" - 4:26
 "Two Ghosts" - 3:57
 "Goettingen, Du" - 3:50
 "O L A" - 4:28
 "If We Knew" - 1:59
 "Step Outside" - 4:43
 "Leviathans Home!" - 3:15

Personnel
Aaron Morgan - guitar, vocals
Carolyn Pennypacker Riggs - vocals, guitar

References

2007 debut albums